Peter Allen Oppegard  (born August 23, 1959 in Knoxville, Tennessee) is an American retired pair skater and coach. With his partner Jill Watson, he is the 1988 Olympic bronze medalist and a three-time U.S. national champion.

In May 2022, Oppegard was suspended by the U.S. Center for SafeSport for misconduct.

Career
Oppegard initially paired with Vicki Heasley. He began competing with Watson in 1985. In their career, Watson and Oppegard won three national titles, a world bronze medal, an Olympic bronze medal, and various other medals. During Watson and Oppegard's free skate at the 1988 Olympics, a photographer dropped his camera bag onto the ice and an usher walked onto the ice to pick it up while the pair was performing an overhead lift. Oppegard later skated with Cindy Landry for a short time. Jill Watson and Peter Oppegard were inducted into the U.S. Figure Skating Hall of Fame in 2004.

As a coach, his skaters have won 10 national singles and pairs titles. The Professional Skaters Association and US Figure Skating has named Oppegard "Choreographer of the Year" and "Coach of the Year".  He coached at the East West Ice Palace in southern California until 2018.

Personal life 
Oppegard was married to Karen Kwan, sister of world champion figure skater Michelle Kwan, and they have 2 daughters, Olivia Colette Oppegard and Sophia Oppegard. As of 2017, they are estranged.

Abuse allegations and suspension 
In February 2021, USA Today reported that Oppegard had been under investigation by the United States Center for SafeSport since July 2020 for allegations of physical abuse, including throwing coffee and hot water at skaters he coached at the East West Ice Palace. American pairs skater Jessica Pfund also alleged that Oppegard bit her on the upper right arm during a training session in 2013, when Pfund was 15 years old. In May 2022, Oppegard was suspended by the U.S. Center for SafeSport for "physical & emotional" misconduct.

Results

With Watson

References

External links
 Watson and Oppegard competition results
 Landry and Oppegard competition results
 Heasley and Oppegard competition results
 Watson and Oppegard at pairsonice.com
 Coaching biography
 

1969 births
American male pair skaters
American figure skating coaches
Figure skaters at the 1988 Winter Olympics
Living people
Olympic bronze medalists for the United States in figure skating
Olympic medalists in figure skating
World Figure Skating Championships medalists
Medalists at the 1988 Winter Olympics
Sportspeople from Knoxville, Tennessee
20th-century American people
21st-century American people